Julie Zogg (born 1 October 1992) is a Swiss snowboarder, specializing in alpine snowboarding.

Career
Zogg competed at the 2014 Winter Olympics for Switzerland. She was 3rd in the qualifying run of the parallel giant slalom, but lost in the 1/8 finals to Canada's Ariane Lavigne, finishing 9th. In the parallel slalom, she qualified 4th, then beat Japan's Tomoka Takeuchi, but was disqualified in the quarterfinals against the eventual champion, Austria's Julia Dujmovits, ending up 7th.

As of September 2014, her best showing at the World Championships is 14th, in the 2011 parallel slalom.

Zogg made her World Cup debut in December 2007. As of September 2014, she has four podium finishes, with her best being a silver medal in parallel slalom at Bad Gastein in 2011–12. Her best overall finish is 6th in 2011–12.

World Cup Podiums

References

External links

1992 births
Living people
Olympic snowboarders of Switzerland
Snowboarders at the 2014 Winter Olympics
Snowboarders at the 2018 Winter Olympics
Snowboarders at the 2022 Winter Olympics
People from Walenstadt
Swiss female snowboarders
Sportspeople from the canton of St. Gallen
21st-century Swiss women